This is the first part of a list of rivers of New South Wales, Australia. With List of rivers of New South Wales (L–Z) it includes all 439 rivers, as of 7 June 2008, listed by the Geographical Names Board of New South Wales in the Geographical Names Register (GNR) of NSW.

See also
 Rivers of New South Wales
 List of rivers of Australia

References

New South Wales (A-K)
 (A-K)
New South Wales-related lists